Ranney School is an independent coeducational, college preparatory day school for students from age 3 (Beginners) through twelfth grade located in Tinton Falls, New Jersey, United States.

History
The school was founded in 1960 by educator Russell G. Ranney to help improve students' college board grades.

As of the 2019–20 school year, the school had an enrollment of 611 students and 74.1 classroom teachers (on an FTE basis), for a student–teacher ratio of 8.2:1. The school's student body was listed as 100% (611) two or more races.

Tuition for the 2021–22 school year ranged from $22,000 for Grades K-5 to $32,180 for Grades 6–12.

The school's third headmaster retired at the end of the 2012–2013 school year, after 20 years of service to the school. Since July 1, 2013, Dr. John W. Griffith has been the school's fourth headmaster.

Governance 
The school is a member of the National Association of Independent Schools and the New Jersey Association of Independent Schools.  The school has been accredited by the Middle States Association of Colleges and Schools Commission on Elementary and Secondary Schools since 1994 and is accredited until January 2027.

Extracurricular activities
The school's student life programs include 20+ sports, 40+ clubs, 10+ Honor Societies, visual arts, and performing arts.

Athletics 
The Ranney Panthers compete in Division B Central of the Shore Conference, an athletic conference comprised of private and public high schools in Monmouth and Ocean counties along the Jersey Shore. The conference operates under the supervision of the New Jersey State Interscholastic Athletic Association (NJSIAA). With 220 students in grades 10-12, NJSIAA classified the school for the 2019–20 school year as Non-Public B for most athletic competition purposes, which included schools with an enrollment of 37 to 366 students in that grade range (equivalent to Group I for public schools). The school also competes against other New Jersey and New York City area private schools.

The school participates in a joint cooperative football team with Mater Dei High School as the host school/lead agency. St. John Vianney High School is the host school for a co-op ice hockey team. These co-op programs operate under agreements scheduled to expire at the end of the 2023–24 school year.

The school has won more than 30 individual and team championships in five years, including swimming, tennis, basketball, fencing, and more. In 2011, the Ranney boys épée team won the state championship, the school's first state title in any sport. In 2012 and 2013, the Varsity Girls' Tennis team won the NJSIAA Non-Public B South Championship.

In its first year in the Shore Conference as a B-Central Division member, 2012–2013, Ranney received the School of the Year and Coach of the Year Awards. Ranney Athletics are present in all divisions, Lower, Middle, and Upper School, including twice-weekly swim practice, an after-school RanneyPlus program, and a weekend Panther Cubs program for younger students. The school also has a crew team and an equestrian club.

The girls' fencing team has won two individual foil titles in 2014 and 2016.

The boys' basketball team won the Non-Public Group B state championship in 2019, defeating Roselle Catholic High School by a score of 56-50 in the tournament final at the RWJBarnabas Health Arena, having lost to Roselle Catholic in the Non-Public B finals a year before on a last-second basket. Ranney came into its first Tournament of Champions as the top seed, winning against number-five seed Moorestown High School by 62-40 in the semifinals and won vs. second-seeded Bergen Catholic High School in the championship game by a score of 67-63 to finish the season with a 31-3 record.

Campus 
The  campus features assembly spaces and media centers, a music wing, two dining halls, two libraries, robotics labs, Innovation Labs (makerspaces), and athletic facilities, including: tennis courts, a track, two gymnasiums, an indoor 25-meter swimming pool, a 415-capacity outdoor grandstand and press box, training and conditioning facilities and fields for soccer, lacrosse, baseball, and softball.

Notable alumni

 Bryan Antoine (born 2000) college basketball player for the Villanova Wildcats men's basketball team.
 Preet Bharara (born 1968), United States Attorney for the Southern District of New York.
 Kirsten Dunst (born 1982), actress. (Attended through the 5th grade).
 Vin Gopal (born 1985, class of 2003), a politician who took office in January 2018 to represent the 11th Legislative District in the New Jersey Senate.
 Jacquie Lee (born 1997), a singer who finished in second place on The Voice season 5.
 Scottie Lewis (born 2000), college basketball player for the Florida Gators.
 Marc Lore (born 1971), entrepreneur, investor, and co-owner of the Minnesota Timberwolves.
 Jessica Springsteen (born 1991), an international equestrian who is the daughter of Bruce Springsteen.

References

External links
Official school website
Data for Ranney School, National Center for Education Statistics

1960 establishments in New Jersey
Educational institutions established in 1960
Middle States Commission on Secondary Schools
New Jersey Association of Independent Schools
Private elementary schools in New Jersey
Private high schools in Monmouth County, New Jersey
Private middle schools in New Jersey
Schools in Monmouth County, New Jersey
Tinton Falls, New Jersey